

Expansion
Four expansion teams joined Major League Baseball for this season: the San Diego Padres, the Kansas City Royals, the Seattle Pilots, and the first MLB team in Canada, the Montreal Expos. To accommodate the additional teams, the two leagues were split into two divisions of East and West. For the first time, extra post-season playoff series were added prior to the World Series, at this juncture best-of-five series between the East and West division leaders in each league.

Champions

Major League Baseball

The most notable part of the 1969 season were the Miracle Mets
World Series: New York Mets over Baltimore Orioles (4–1); Donn Clendenon, MVP

All-Star Game, July 23 at Robert F. Kennedy Memorial Stadium: National League, 9–3; Willie McCovey, MVP

Other champions
College World Series: Arizona State
Japan Series: Yomiuri Giants over Hankyu Braves (4–2)
Big League World Series: Mojave Desert LL, Barstow, California
Little League World Series: Taipei, Taiwan
Senior League World Series: Sacramento, California

Awards and honors
Baseball Hall of Fame
Roy Campanella
Stan Coveleski
Waite Hoyt
Stan Musial
Most Valuable Player
Harmon Killebrew, Minnesota Twins, 3B (AL)
Willie McCovey, San Francisco Giants, 1B (NL)
Cy Young Award
Mike Cuellar, Baltimore Orioles and Denny McLain, Detroit Tigers (AL)
Tom Seaver, New York Mets (NL)
Rookie of the Year
Lou Piniella, Kansas City Royals, OF (AL)
Ted Sizemore, Los Angeles Dodgers, 2B (NL)
Gold Glove Award
Joe Pepitone (1B) (AL) 
Davey Johnson (2B) (AL) 
Brooks Robinson (3B) (AL) 
Mark Belanger (SS) (AL) 
Paul Blair (OF) (AL) 
Mickey Stanley (OF) (AL) 
Carl Yastrzemski (OF) (AL)
Bill Freehan (C) (AL) 
Jim Kaat (P) (AL)

MLB statistical leaders

The save is introduced as an official statistic this year.  Ron Perranoski lead the majors with 31.

Major league baseball final standings

Events

January–March
January 2 – In response to major-league owners' continued refusal to increase their contributions to the players' pension fund commensurately with their television broadcast revenues, the Major League Baseball Players Association urges players not to sign any new contracts.
January 21 – Stan Musial and Roy Campanella are voted into the Hall of Fame by BBWAA members.
January 22 – The Expos trade Donn Clendenon and Jesús Alou to the Houston Astros for Rusty Staub. The Astros had recently hired Clendenon's former Pittsburgh Pirates manager Harry Walker, with whom Clendenon had a personality clash, to steer their club and Clendenon refused to report to his new team. The Expos and Astros worked out a new deal, and Clendenon joined the Expos on April 19.
February 2 – Pitchers Stan Coveleski and Waite Hoyt are voted into the Hall of Fame by the Special Veterans Committee.
February 17 – Spring training opens without 400 players who have decided to boycott it over the pension-fund impasse.
February 26 – The boycott ends when owners accept most of the players' terms.
March 1 – Mickey Mantle announces his retirement.
March 16 – A plane crash in Maracaibo, Venezuela kills 155 people including first baseman Carlos Santeliz, the Venezuelan League Rookie of the Year, on his way to the Braves' spring training camp. Another fatality is pitcher Látigo Chávez, en route to the Giants' camp. Chávez (1–0) was 12–5 with Double-A Waterbury in the Eastern League (1967), including seven shutouts. Pitcher Pablo Torrealba was also scheduled to take the flight, but missed it and took a later one.

April–June
April 8
At Shea Stadium, Dan McGinn hits the first home run in Montréal Expos history, a solo shot against Tom Seaver.
At Anaheim Stadium, Mike Hegan hits the first home run in Seattle Pilots history, a two-run shot against Jim McGlothlin.
At San Diego Stadium, Ed Spiezio hits the first home run in San Diego Padres history, a solo shot against Don Wilson of the Houston Astros.
At Municipal Stadium, the Kansas City Royals, in their inaugural game, defeat the Minnesota Twins 4–3 in 12 innings. Two pitching stars on the Baltimore Orioles team that won the 1966 World Series pitch for the Royals in this game: Wally Bunker throws the very first pitch, and Moe Drabowsky wins the game in relief. The Royals' first batter, Lou Piniella, gets the first hit for the franchise, leading off the game with a double, and scoring their first run on Jerry Adair's single one batter later.
At Wrigley Field, the Chicago Cubs opened their wild 1969 season in dramatic fashion, as Willie Smith hit a pinch-hit, two-run, walk-off home run in the bottom of the 11th inning to defeat the Philadelphia Phillies 7–6.
April 9 – Billy Williams hits 4 consecutive doubles to tie the Major League record during an 11–3 win over the Phillies at Wrigley Field. The Cubs scored seven runs in the seventh inning.
April 10 – At Shea Stadium, Tommie Agee hits a tremendous home run halfway up in the left field upper deck, a feat that was never matched.
April 11 – Seattle successfully inaugurates Major League Baseball at Sick's Stadium‚ as pitcher Gary Bell defeats the Chicago White Sox 7–0. The Seattle Pilots attract 17‚850 today and will draw just 678‚000 for the season. U.S. Senator Henry "Scoop" Jackson throws out the first ball and will do the same in the Seattle Mariners opener‚ in 1977.
April 12 – At Detroit, the Yankees' Mel Stottlemyre allows just one hit, a 4th-inning double to Jim Northrup, and beats Denny McLain and the Detroit Tigers 4–0. For the 3rd time in two years, Northrup saves the Tigers from being the victims of a no-hitter.
April 13 – At the Oakland–Alameda County Coliseum, Mike Fiore hits the first home run in Kansas City Royals history, a solo shot against Blue Moon Odom.
April 14 – The Montréal Expos open at home with an 8–7 win over the St. Louis Cardinals at Parc Jarry.
April 17 – At Connie Mack Stadium, Bill Stoneman of the Montréal Expos no-hits the Philadelphia Phillies 7–0. The game is only the ninth in Expos history, and only the fifth start in Stoneman's Major League career.
April 25 – The Cubs trade Joe Niekro, Gary Ross, and Francisco Libran to the San Diego Padres for Dick Selma.
May 1 – The Houston Astros, no-hit the day before by Jim Maloney of the Cincinnati Reds, answer back as Don Wilson pitches a 4–0 no-hitter, with 13 strikeouts over the Reds. Houston ties a National League record with just one assist. In Wilson's previous start against Cincinnati, on April 22, he gave up six runs in five innings in a 14–0 loss. The back-to-back no-hitters are only the second in Major League history, the feat having been accomplished just the year before by Gaylord Perry and Ray Washburn.
May 4 – At Anaheim Stadium, in only the 25th game in Kansas City Royals history, Bob Oliver goes 6-for-6 with a home run and a double in the Royals' 15–1 drubbing of the California Angels. Oliver becomes the first player to collect six hits in one game since Jesús Alou did so for the San Francisco Giants on July 10, and the first American League player to do so since Floyd Robinson with the Chicago White Sox on July 22, .
May 12 – Bob Gibson of the St. Louis Cardinals becomes the seventh pitcher in National League history to strike out the side on nine pitches, his victims being Len Gabrielson, Paul Popovich and John Miller in the seventh inning of a game against the Los Angeles Dodgers. Gibson enjoys his feat as part of a 6–2 victory for St. Louis.
May 13 – Ernie Banks of the Chicago Cubs reaches the 1,500 runs batted in milestone while driving in seven runs in a 19–0 shellacking of the expansion San Diego Padres. Hard-throwing right-hander Dick Selma earns the victory as the Cubs tie a modern-day record for the most one-sided shutout in National League history.
May 18 – Tying a major league record, the Minnesota Twins steal five bases in the third inning against the Detroit battery of Mickey Lolich and Bill Freehan.  Four of the steals occur during a single Harmon Killebrew at-bat, and two of the steals, by César Tovar and Rod Carew, are of home plate. 
June 15 – The Montreal Expos deal Donn Clendenon to the New York Mets in exchange for Steve Renko, Kevin Collins and two minor leaguers.
June 19 – Chicago Cubs manager Leo Durocher, 63, weds for the fourth time, marrying 40-year-old Lynne Walker Goldblatt.
June 21 – The Minnesota Twins and Oakland Athletics enter the tenth inning tied 3–3.  Tying a 1928 New York Yankees record, the Twins score eleven runs in the top of the inning, and beat Oakland 14–4.
June 22 – The Cubs score four runs in the ninth inning to defeat the Montreal Expos 7–6 in the first game of a double-header at Wrigley Field. Jim Hickman hit a 2-run walk-off homer.
June 26 – Jim Hickman's home run in the 10th inning defeats the Pittsburgh Pirates 7–5 at Wrigley Field. On the spur of the moment Ron Santo leaped in the air and clicked his heels 3 times on the way to the clubhouse. The victory dance became a hit with euphoric Cub fans.

July
July 8 – With three runs in the 9th inning, the New York Mets beat the Chicago Cubs 4–3, cutting Chicago's lead in the National League East to four games. Chicago's Ron Santo rips into center fielder Don Young for two misplays in the outfield; Santo apologizes the next day for criticizing Young, who had left early and didn't take the team bus. Santo is later booed in his first game back at Wrigley Field.
July 9 – With one out in the ninth inning, the Chicago Cubs' Jim Qualls lines a single to left center to break up Tom Seaver's perfect game bid. The New York Mets' 4–0 victory over the Cubs at Shea Stadium would go down in history as "Tom Seaver's Imperfect Game."
July 13 – In the third meeting between the two brothers, the San Diego Padres' Joe Niekro defeats his younger brother Phil Niekro of the Atlanta Braves 1–0; Joe is 2–1 over Phil.
July 23 – At R.F.K. Memorial Stadium, Willie McCovey hits two home runs as the National League beats the American League 9–3, for its seventh straight All-Star Game win. McCovey is named MVP, with his two homers tying an All-Star Game record set earlier by Arky Vaughan (1941), Ted Williams (1946) and Al Rosen (1954).  The game was postponed by one day after heavy rains in the Washington, D.C. area.  When the AL's Don Mincher pinch-hit in the fourth inning, he became a trivia answer: the only Seattle Pilot to appear in an All-Star game.
July 26 – Randy Hundley drives in all three Cub runs, including a walk-off single in the 11th inning, to lead the Cubs to a 3–2 win over the Los Angeles Dodgers at Wrigley Field.
July 27 - In the most dominant shutout in Orioles history, the Baltimore Orioles defeat the Chicago White Sox, 17–0 at Memorial Stadium. Jim Hardin pitches a 2-hit shutout, walking none and hits a 3-run home run in the bottom of the fourth off of Gary Bell to make it 13–0, the Orioles would plate 4 more runs and belt out 20 hits, all Oriole starters hit safely. In Baltimore's 100th game of the season, they stand at 69–31 and have a 12.5-game lead over the Detroit Tigers in the newly formed American League East.
July 29 – Willie McCovey hits his 300th career home run helping the San Francisco Giants beat the Chicago Cubs, 4–2.
July 30 – After losing the first game of a doubleheader with the Houston Astros 16–3, the New York Mets were down 7–0 in the third inning when Johnny Edwards hit a double to Cleon Jones in left field to make the score 8–0. Mets manager Gil Hodges emerged from the dugout, walked past Nolan Ryan on the mound, and walked all the way out to left field. A few minutes later, Hodges walked back to the dugout, with Jones a few paces behind him, and replaced Jones in left with Ron Swoboda. According to Jones, he pointed down to the water filled turf. Hodges then said that something must be wrong with Jones's ankle and pulled him for that reason (Jones was kept out of the line-up for the next two games, and used only as a pinch hitter in the two after that). Newspapers report that Jones was removed for failure to hustle, and Hodges decided to do so publicly to show that he would not tolerate lack of effort on his team, even from its star player.

August

August 1 - Willie Davis of the Los Angeles Dodgers began his 31-game hit streak this day. Coming into this game Willie was batting .260 - by the time the streak ended on September 4 Willie was batting .318 - during the streak Willie hit .459 and broke the Dodgers franchise record of 29 games set by Zack Wheat. Willie Davis' 31-game hit streak was the 3rd longest in N.L. history and as of 2017 is still the Dodgers record.
August 5 – The Pittsburgh Pirates' Willie Stargell hits the first home run hit completely out of Dodger Stadium.  Los Angeles pitcher Alan Foster surrenders the 506-foot blast—to date, the longest home run in Dodger Stadium history.  (Stargell will hit another homer out of Dodger Stadium, off Andy Messersmith in 1973.) The mammoth home run comes in the seventh inning and breaks a 3–3 tie, a three-run home run by Andy Kosco having tied the game for the Dodgers in the bottom of the sixth; Pittsburgh scores seven more runs in the ninth inning and defeats Los Angeles 11–3.
August 10
Citing damage to his right shoulder, Don Drysdale retires from the Los Angeles Dodgers.  He is the last player still playing for the Dodgers that had also played in Brooklyn.
At Baltimore, the Orioles' Mike Cuellar allows just one hit, a top-of-the-ninth single to César Tovar, and beats the Minnesota Twins 2–0. For the second time this season, Tovar saves the Twins from being the victims of a no-hitter.
August 13
Montréal reliever Roy Face gives up the last of his record 21 extra-inning home runs, an 11th-inning grand slam to the Cincinnati Reds' Johnny Bench. Cincinnati wins 8–3 in Montréal.
Only four days after coming off the disabled list, Jim Palmer of the Baltimore Orioles no-hits the Oakland Athletics 8–0 at Memorial Stadium. The home plate umpire is Lou DiMuro, whose son Mike would call balls and strikes for Roy Halladay's perfect game on May 29, .
August 14 – In the National League Eastern Division, the Chicago Cubs lead the St. Louis Cardinals by 8.5 games and the New York Mets by 9.5 games.
August 19 – At Wrigley Field, Ken Holtzman of the Chicago Cubs no-hits the Atlanta Braves 3–0 without striking out a single batter the entire game. Holtzman survives a scare in the seventh as Hank Aaron's fly ball to deep left field leading off the inning appears to be going over the wall for a home run; however, a stiff wind cuts into the ball and enables Billy Williams to catch it at the warning track. Aaron will ground out to Cubs' second baseman Glenn Beckert for the game's final out.

September
September 8 – The Chicago Cubs open a crucial two game series against the New York Mets at Shea Stadium. Cubs starter Bill Hands knocks down the Mets' leadoff batter Tommie Agee in the first inning. Jerry Koosman hits the next Cubs batter he faces, Ron Santo, in the hand, breaking it. Agee hits a two-run home run in the third, and the Mets win 3–2.
September 9 – During the Mets' 7–1 victory over the Chicago Cubs at Shea, a black cat jumps on the field and runs past Ron Santo in the on-deck circle.
September 10 – A loss by the Chicago Cubs, and a double header sweep by the New York Mets, gives the Mets their first lead of the National League East Division. The Mets will not relinquish their lead from this point, as the Cubs suffer through a legendary collapse.
September 15 – The St. Louis Cardinals' Steve Carlton strikes out a record 19 New York Mets in a losing effort, as the Mets defeat the Cards 4–3 at Busch Stadium.
September 20 – At Shea Stadium, Bob Moose of the Pittsburgh Pirates no-hits the New York Mets 4–0.
September 21 - At Candlestick Park, the San Francisco Giants defeat the Los Angeles Dodgers 4–3 in 10 innings as Maury Wills commits an error on Jim Davenport's ground ball, allowing Willie McCovey to score the winning run. Ironically, this game marks Dodger Bill Buckner's Major League debut; Buckner, who grounds out to second baseman Ron Hunt while pinch-hitting for pitcher Jim Brewer in the ninth inning, will become well known for Mookie Wilson's ground ball going through his legs in Game 6 of the 1986 World Series.
September 22 
 Willie Mays hits his 600th career home run helping the San Francisco Giants beat the San Diego Padres 4–2.
 The Minnesota Twins survived a ninth inning scare as they beat the Kansas City Royals 4-3 to clinch the American League West title on Harmon Killebrew's 47th home run and Cesar Tovar's two-run-scoring singles.
September 23 – Carl Yastrzemski hits his 200th career home run helping the Boston Red Sox beat the New York Yankees 8–3.
September 24 – After 7 uninspired losing seasons, the New York Mets clinch the National League East Division title as Donn Clendenon hit 2 home runs in a 6–0 Mets win over Steve Carlton and the St. Louis Cardinals. The Mets have won 38 out of their 49 games dating from August 14.  The Cubs will finish the season 8 games behind the Mets, and not win the division until exactly fifteen years from this day.

October–December
October 2 – The Seattle Pilots finish what would be their only season in the Emerald City with a 3–1 loss to the Oakland Athletics at Sick's Stadium.
October 4 – The American League and National League Championship Series begin, the first such series to feature the respective leagues' division champions. The Baltimore Orioles would sweep the Minnesota Twins in 3 games for the A.L. pennant; the New York Mets would do the same against the Atlanta Braves for the N.L. crown.
October 7 – The St. Louis Cardinals trade Curt Flood to the Philadelphia Phillies in a seven-player deal that also sends Tim McCarver, Byron Browne and Joe Hoerner to the Phillies and Dick Allen, Cookie Rojas and Jerry Johnson to the Cardinals. Flood, however, refuses to report to the Phillies and instead challenges baseball's reserve clause in a lawsuit that will eventually reach the Supreme Court. He will sit out the entire  season.
October 8 - After firing Dave Bristol as manager despite an 89–73 season, the Cincinnati Reds hire Sparky Anderson to replace him.
October 9 – The Pittsburgh Pirates re-hire Danny Murtaugh as their manager for what will be his third of four stints as Pirate skipper. This stint will see the Pirates win the  National League East title for their first post-season berth since winning the 1960 World Series (with Murtaugh at the helm), as well as winning the 1971 World Series.
October 13 - In the first of many firings in his career, Minnesota Twins manager Billy Martin was fired by owner Calvin Griffith after his Twins we're swept in the American League Championship Series.
October 15 – Baltimore Orioles manager Earl Weaver is warned during Game 4 of the 1969 World Series by umpire Shag Crawford not to argue balls and strikes. After receiving this warning, Weaver follows Crawford to home plate, and is immediately ejected from the game. The Mets would go on to win the game 2–1 in 10 innings to take a 3–1 lead in the World Series.
October 16 – The Baltimore Orioles are ahead 3–0 in Game five of the 1969 World Series at Shea Stadium when Dave McNally strikes New York Mets batter Cleon Jones in the foot with a pitch. However, home plate umpire Lou DiMuro ruled that the ball missed Jones. Mets manager Gil Hodges emerges from the dugout to argue, and showed DiMuro the shoe-polish smudged ball. DiMuro reversed his call, and awarded Jones first base. The following batter, Donn Clendenon, hit a two-run home run to pull the Mets within a run of Baltimore (his third home run of the Series). Following an Al Weis solo home run in the seventh to tie the game, the Mets score two in the eighth to take a 5–3 lead. Jerry Koosman pitches a complete game for the Mets, who win the World Series in five games. Clendenon is named World Series MVP.
November 12 –  Harmon Killebrew of the Minnesota Twins is voted Most Valuable Player by the BBWAA, after he led the American League with 49 home runs, 140 RBI, and a .430 on-base percentage.
November 25 – Outfielder Lou Piniella, who hit .282 with 11 home runs and 68 RBI, is named American League Rookie of the Year over pitcher Mike Nagy (12–2, 3.11 ERA), outfielder Carlos May (.281, 18, 62) and pitcher Ken Tatum (7–2, 1.36).
November 28 – Second baseman Ted Sizemore  becomes the seventh Dodgers player to win the NL Rookie of the Year Award. Sizemore joins Jackie Robinson,  Don Newcombe, Joe Black, Junior Gilliam, Frank Howard and Jim Lefebvre.

Births

January–March
January 1 – Roberto Rivera
January 3 – Cris Colón
January 6 – Alvin Morman
January 7 – Chris Hatcher
January 8 – Brian Boehringer
January 9 – Domingo Jean
January 10 – Takahito Nomura
January 11 – Manny Acta
January 13 – Kevin Foster
January 13 – Orlando Miller
January 15 – Delino DeShields
January 16 – Kevin McGehee
January 19 – Orlando Palmeiro
January 21 – Rusty Greer
January 22 – Keith Gordon
January 27 – Phil Plantier

February
February 3 – Terry Bradshaw
February 4 – Brad Cornett
February 5 – David Holdridge
February 6 – Bob Wickman
February 10 – Jayhawk Owens
February 11 – Bryan Eversgerd
February 11 – Kevin King
February 13 – Mike Mimbs
February 14 – Craig Bjornson
February 15 – Brian Williams
February 16 – Tim Costo
February 23 – Frank Charles
February 25 – Huck Flener
February 25 – Les Forman
February 27 – Willie Banks

March
March 1 – Doug Creek
March 4 – Ed Giovanola
March 4 – Lee Tinsley
March 14 – Jalal Leach
March 17 – Scott Brow
March 23 – Chris Turner
March 25 – Travis Fryman
March 25 – Eric Helfand
March 25 – Paul Menhart
March 25 – Scott Sanders
March 25 – Erik Schullstrom
March 25 – Dan Wilson
March 28 – Craig Paquette
March 30 – Chris Gardner

April
April 1 – Frank Castillo
April 2 – Steve Hosey
April 4 – Carlos Reyes
April 4 – Mark Strittmatter
April 6 – Bret Boone
April 7 – Ricky Bones
April 8 – Kirk Dressendorfer
April 8 – Pete Walker
April 14 – Brad Ausmus
April 14 – Brad Pennington
April 15 – Jeromy Burnitz
April 16 – Ken Takahashi
April 16 – Fernando Viña
April 17 – Jeff Ball
April 18 – Angelo Encarnación
April 20 – Dan Smith
April 22 – George Williams
April 26 – Ricky Trlicek
April 28 – Jimmy Myers

May
May 1 – Phil Hiatt
May 3 – Dan Iassogna
May 5 – John Mallee
May 9 – Desi Wilson
May 10 – John Cummings
May 10 – Pete Schourek
May 13 – Lyle Mouton
May 15 – Hideki Irabu
May 16 – Mike Heathcott
May 17 – Rick Huisman
May 18 – Kerry Woodson
May 19 – Phil Leftwich
May 22 – Vaughn Eshelman
May 23 – Ramón Caraballo
May 24 – Rob Drake
May 26 – John O'Donoghue
May 27 – Todd Hundley
May 28 – Mike DiFelice
May 29 – Toby Borland
May 31 – Rikkert Faneyte
May 31 – Tim Van Egmond

June
June 2 – Kurt Abbott
June 4 – Robert Pérez
June 7 – Jeff Pierce
June 10 – Kevin Flora
June 11 – Brian Koelling
June 16 – Kevin Young
June 21 – Donovan Osborne
June 25 – Brad Woodall
June 26 – Mike Myers
June 26 – Rodney Myers
June 28 – Todd Revenig
June 29 – José Alberro
June 29 – George Glinatsis
June 29 – Pablo Martínez

July
July 2 – So Taguchi
July 6 – Jeff Darwin
July 8 – Bobby Ayala
July 8 – Rosario Rodríguez
July 8 – Ernie Young
July 10 – Marty Cordova
July 11 – Mark Carlson
July 14 – José Hernández
July 21 – Denny Harriger
July 23 – Francisco Matos
July 23 – Henry Mercedes
July 24 – Jim Wolf
July 26 – Greg Colbrunn
July 29 – Mike Williams

August
August 1 – Kevin Jarvis
August 1 – Brent Knackert
August 2 – Dae-Sung Koo
August 3 – Steve Dixon
August 4 – Troy O'Leary
August 5 – Marcos Armas
August 6 – Keith Mitchell
August 7 – Brian Kowitz
August 7 – Stan Spencer
August 8 – Ray Montgomery
August 9 – Troy Percival
August 13 – Alex Fernández
August 19 – Matt Franco
August 19 – Miguel Jimenez
August 20 – Mark Holzemer
August 21 – Andújar Cedeño
August 22 – Hipólito Pichardo
August 26 – Ricky Bottalico
August 26 – Ken Grundt
August 31 – Nate Minchey

September
September 2 – Mike Thomas
September 3 – Tom Thobe
September 7 – Darren Bragg
September 7 – Brent Cookson
September 7 – Rafael Quirico
September 11 – Shannon Penn
September 11 – Eduardo Pérez
September 12 – Hilly Hathaway
September 13 – Russ Davis
September 14 – Mike Durant
September 15 – Herbert Perry
September 19 – Marc Ronan
September 21 – Jason Christiansen
September 21 – Ben Shelton
September 22 – Jeff Barry
September 22 – César Devarez
September 23 – Jeff Cirillo
September 25 – Oscar Múñoz
September 25 – David Weathers
September 25 – Tony Womack
September 26 – Brian Looney

October
October 2 – Alan Newman
October 2 – Matt Walbeck
October 6 – Robert Person
October 9 – Kevin Jordan
October 11 – Larry Luebbers
October 12 – José Valentín
October 12 – Derrick White
October 13 – Tim Crabtree
October 13 – Damian Miller
October 14 – Héctor Ortiz
October 16 – Matt Ruebel
October 17 – Chris Tremie
October 18 – Jeff McNeely
October 19 – Lance Dickson
October 20 – Juan González
October 21 – Chuck Smith
October 22 – Héctor Carrasco
October 22 – Ariel Prieto
October 24 – Arthur Rhodes
October 25 – Keith Garagozzo
October 25 – Larry Thomas
October 26 – Mark Sweeney
October 28 – Kirk Bullinger
October 31 – Oreste Marrero
October 31 – Damon Mashore

November
November 3 – Kenny Robinson
November 6 – Don Wengert
November 7 – Dave Fleming
November 8 – Shane Halter
November 9 – Ángel Miranda
November 11 – Damion Easley
November 13 – Rigo Beltrán
November 16 – Pete Rose (Jr.)
November 17 – Ben Weber
November 19 – Steve Dreyer
November 21 – Ken Griffey Jr.
November 23 – Doug Brady
November 23 – David McCarty
November 26 – Sam Militello
November 27 – Chris Eddy
November 27 – Tim Laker
November 28 – Robb Nen
November 29 – Mariano Rivera
November 30 – Mark Lewis

December
December 2 – Steve Sisco
December 3 – Kevin Morgan
December 9 – Mike Fyhrie
December 9 – Ramón García
December 10 – Pat Ahearne
December 10 – Jon Zuber
December 13 – Doug Saunders
December 14 – Scott Hatteberg
December 14 – Dave Nilsson
December 16 – Jason Wood
December 17 – Rudy Pemberton
December 18 – Joe Randa
December 29 – Scott Ruffcorn
December 30 – Steve Gajkowski

Deaths

January
January 5 – Tiny Osborne, 75,  pitcher who worked in 142 games for the Chicago Cubs (1922–1924) and Brooklyn Robins (1924–1925); father of Bobo Osborne.
January 5 – Larry Pratt, 81, catcher for Boston (American League) in 1914, then Brooklyn and Newark (both of the "outlaw" Federal League) in 1915.
January 6 – Larry Cheney, 82, three-time 20-game winning pitcher for the Chicago Cubs (1911–1915), Brooklyn Robins (1915–1919), Boston Braves (1919) and Philadelphia Phillies (1919); led National League hurlers with 26 victories in 1912.
January 6 – Hank Olmsted, 89, pitcher for the 1905 Boston Americans.
January 6 – Clint Rogge, 79, pitcher who as a rookie won 17 games for the 1915 Pittsburgh Rebels of the Federal League; later, hurled in six contests for 1921 Cincinnati Reds.
January 6 – Jim Viox, 78, Pittsburgh Pirates second baseman who played in 506 games from 1912 to 1916.
January 7 – Bill Lobe, 56, minor-league catcher who spent nine years (1951–1959) as bullpen coach of the Cleveland Indians.
January 18 – Ray Kennedy, 73, second baseman turned executive and scout; general manager of Pittsburgh Pirates (1946), farm system director of Pirates (1947–1948) and Detroit Tigers (1949–1951), and player personnel director of Kansas City Athletics (1955); appeared in one MLB game as a player for the St. Louis Browns (1916).
January 21 – Dick Terwilliger, 62, pitcher who threw three scoreless innings of relief in his lone MLB appearance on August 18, 1932, as a member of the St. Louis Cardinals.
January 23 – Al Bridwell, 85, shortstop whose apparent game-winning single for the New York Giants in a 1908 contest led to the controversial play in which baserunner Fred Merkle was eventually called out for not touching second base.
January 27 – Al Schweitzer, 86, reserve outfielder for 1908–1911 St. Louis Browns.
January 30 – Sam Bennett, 84, catcher/outfielder for Dayton and St. Louis of the Negro National League over five seasons spanning 1920 to 1925.

February
February 2 – Ray Schmandt, 73, backup first- and second baseman for 1915 St. Louis Browns and 1918–1922 Brooklyn Robins; appeared in 1920 World Series.
February 13 – Shags Horan, 73, reserve outfielder who appeared in 22 games for 1924 New York Yankees.
February 16 – Mul Holland, 66, pitcher who had trials with three National League clubs during three seasons spanning 1926 to 1929.
February 18 – Jack Zeller, 85, executive and scout; general manager of the Detroit Tigers from 1938 to 1945; later, director of scouting of the Boston Braves.
February 19 – Doc White, 89, Chicago White Sox pitcher whose record of five consecutive shutouts was finally broken by Don Drysdale in 1968.
February 23 – Bubbles Hargrave, 76, catcher who hit .310 lifetime in 852 career games for the Chicago Cubs (1913–1915), Cincinnati Reds (1921–1928) and New York Yankees (1930); National League batting champion (.353) in 1926, first catcher to win a batting title in post-1901 era.
February 23 – Bill Swift, 60, pitcher who posted a 95–82 (3.58) record in 336 MLB games for four clubs, principally the Pittsburgh Pirates, between 1932 and 1943.
February 25 – Russ Wrightstone, 75, versatile infielder/outfielder (primarily a third- and first baseman) who appeared in 929 games for 1920–1928 Philadelphia Phillies and 1928 New York Giants.

March
March 10 – Max Rosenfeld, 66, outfielder who got into 42 games with Brooklyn of the National League between 1931 and 1933.
March 12 – Joe Engel, 76, left-handed pitcher in 102 games, 99 of them for the Washington Senators, between 1912 and 1920, then longtime Washington scout and operator of the Chattanooga Lookouts, the Senators' top farm team; namesake of Engel Stadium.
March 14 – Heinie Zimmerman, 82, third baseman who played 1,456 games for Chicago Cubs (1907–1916) and New York Giants (1916–1919) who won the NL triple crown in 1912; barred from baseball in 1919 for his role in fixing games.
March 16 – William Bell, 71, All-Star pitcher of the Negro leagues who posted the highest career winning percentage (114–52, .687) in black baseball.
March 16 – Néstor Chávez, 21, pitcher who played for the 1967 San Francisco Giants.
March 16 – Andy Rush, 79, pitcher who made four appearances for 1925 Brooklyn Robins.
March 17 – Poindexter Williams, 71, catcher who played for six teams in the Negro National League, primarily the Birmingham Black Barons, between 1921 and 1933.
March 18 – Rafael Almeida, 81, Cuban third baseman who played in 102 games for the 1911–1913 Cincinnati Reds; one of first three Cuban-born players in MLB during its post-1901 era.
March 20 – Jim Clark, 81, outfielder who played 16 games for 1911–1912 St. Louis Cardinals.
March 21 – Everett Booe, 77, outfielder who appeared in 125 games for Pittsburgh of the National League (1913) and Indianapolis and Buffalo of the Federal League (1914).
March 21 – Pinky Higgins, 59, third baseman for the Philadelphia Athletics, Boston Red Sox and Detroit Tigers for 14 years between 1930 and 1946; held American League record for career games at that position; three-time All-Star; later manager (1955–1959 and 1960–1962) and general manager (1963–1965) of the Red Sox.
March 22 – Floyd Speer, 56, relief pitcher who worked in a total of three games for the wartime 1943–1944 Chicago White Sox.
March 23 – Oris Hockett, 59, outfielder for 1938–1939 Brooklyn Dodgers and 1941–1945 Cleveland Indians, appearing in 551 career games; 1944 American League All-Star.

April
April 2 – Ben Cardoni, 48, pitcher who was winless in six decisions and 36 career games for the 1943–1945 Boston Braves.
April 2 – Bill Force, 73, pitcher who appeared in 186 games between 1921 and 1929 for the Detroit Stars and Baltimore Black Sox of the Negro leagues.
April 3 – Charley Stanceu, 53, pitcher who worked in 39 career games for the New York Yankees (1941 and 1946) and Philadelphia Phillies (1946).
April 4 – Les Wilson, 83, outfielder who played for the 1911 Boston Red Sox.
April 4 – Chuck Ward, 74, shortstop for 1917 Pittsburgh Pirates and utility infielder for 1918–1922 Brooklyn Robins.
April 7 – Si Rosenthal, 65, outfielder who played for the Red Sox from 1925 to 1926.
April 8 – Win Noyes, 79, pitcher in 49 MLB games for the Boston Braves (1913), Philadelphia Athletics (1917, 1919) and Chicago White Sox (1919).
April 10 – Scotty Robb, 60, one of few mid-century umpires employed by both major leagues; worked in 662 National League games and two All-Star games between August 28, 1947 and May 4, 1952, when he resigned; then joined American League arbiter crew and officiated in 207 contests from May 13, 1952 to June 28, 1953. 
April 11 – Al Kaiser, 82, outfielder in 155 games for Chicago and Boston of the National League (1911–1912) and Indianapolis of the Federal League (1914).
April 13 – William Walsingham Jr., 59, front-office executive; vice president of St. Louis Cardinals (1942–1955) and executive VP of Baltimore Orioles (1957–1958).
April 19 – Harry Cassady, 88, outfielder who played briefly for the 1904 Pittsburgh Pirates and 1905 Washington Senators.
April 19 – Bob "Rip" Collins, 59, catcher who appeared in 50 career games for the Chicago Cubs (1940) and New York Yankees (1944).
April 21 – Clarence Palm, 61, catcher in the Negro leagues whose career spanned 1927 to 1946; member of champion 1928 St. Louis Stars.
April 23 – Freddie Moncewicz, 65, backup shortstop for the 1928 Boston Red Sox.
April 27 – Harry Taylor, 61, first baseman who played 10 games with the 1932 Chicago Cubs.
April 28 – Joe Burg, 86, third baseman/shortstop who appeared in 13 late-season games for the 1910 Boston Doves of the National League.
April 29 – Ed Monroe, 74, pitcher who made ten appearances for the 1917–1918 New York Yankees.

May
May 1 – Gary Wilson, 90, second baseman for the 1902 Boston Americans.
May 2 – Steve Larkin, 58, pitcher who appeared in two games during May 1934 for the Detroit Tigers.
May 5 – Eddie Cicotte, 84, pitcher who won 208 games for the Tigers, Red Sox and White Sox, but was thrown out of baseball as one of the eight "Black Sox" involved in fixing the 1919 World Series; he was the first of the eight to come forward, confessing his involvement and testifying before the grand jury.
May 7 – Ray Mack, 52, light-hitting second baseman for Cleveland Indians, New York Yankees and Chicago Cubs who played in 791 games from 1938–1944 and 1946–1947.
May 15 – Frank "Shag" Shaughnessy, 86, U.S.-born outfielder and Notre Dame graduate who played in nine American League games for Washington (1905) and Philadelphia (1908) and coached for the 1928 Detroit Tigers; pivotal figure in both the U.S. and Canada in minor league baseball (manager between 1909 and 1936, inventor of the "Shaughnessy playoffs" in 1936, and president of the International League from 1936–1960); also an influential gridiron football coach, and general manager of hockey's original Ottawa Senators; posthumously elected in 1983 to Canadian Baseball Hall of Fame.
May 17 – Pants Rowland, 90, manager of the 1917 World Series champion Chicago White Sox, later president of the Pacific Coast League from 1944 to 1954, then longtime vice president of Chicago Cubs.
May 19 – Jim Tobin, 56, good-hitting knuckleball pitcher who hurled in 287 career games for the Pittsburgh Pirates, Boston Bees/Braves, and Detroit Tigers between 1937 and 1945; threw no-hitter against Brooklyn on April 27, 1944; batted .230 with 17 homers and 102 RBI in 796 career at bats; hit three homers in a game for Boston on May 13, 1942, and made 109 career appearances as a pinch hitter in addition to his mound duties.
May 20 – Lee Allen, 54, historian at the Baseball Hall of Fame since 1959, former sportswriter.
May 21 – Dennis Burns, 70, pitcher who worked in 41 games for the 1923–1924 Philadelphia Athletics.
May 25 – Jim Riley, 74, Canadian infielder who played in six total MLB games for the St. Louis Browns (1921) and Washington Senators (1923); the only athlete in sports history to play both Major League Baseball and in the National Hockey League.
May 26 – Harland Rowe, 73, third baseman who played 17 games for 1916 Philadelphia Athletics.
May 27 – Lou Jackson, 33, outfielder who played 34 total games for the 1958–1959 Chicago Cubs and 1964 Baltimore Orioles; achieved success in Nippon Professional Baseball, smashing 68 home runs over three seasons (1966–1968).
May 28 – Gus Getz, 79, infielder for five big league clubs, principally Boston and Brooklyn of the National League, over seven seasons between 1909 and 1918.

June
June 3 – Cobe Jones, 61, shortstop who got into 26 games for the 1929–1930 Pittsburgh Pirates; later, a scout.
June 10 – Charlie Fuchs, 55, World War II-era pitcher who hurled in 47 games for the Detroit Tigers, Philadelphia Phillies, St. Louis Browns and Brooklyn Dodgers between 1941 and 1944.
June 17 – Byron Houck, 77, pitched in 118 major league games; as a member of 1912–1913 Philadelphia Athletics, he went 14–6 for the 1913 World Series champs, then jumped to the "outlaw" Federal League, where he hurled for the 1914 Brooklyn Tip-Tops; returned to the American League in 1918 as a St. Louis Brown.
June 24 – John Perrin, 71, right fielder for 1921 Boston Red Sox; later a fullback/quarterback for the NFL Hartford Blues.
June 28 – Sammy Gee, 41, shortstop who appeared in 13 games for the 1948 New York Cubans of the Negro National League.
June 29 – Ted McGrew, 89, minor league player and manager, National League umpire (1930–1931, 1933–1934), then a longtime scout for numerous MLB teams.
June 30 – Milt Gray, 55, catcher who appeared in two May 1937 games for the Washington Senators.

July
July 2 – Art Scharein, 64, infielder who played 205 games for the 1932–1934 St. Louis Browns.
July 3 – Harry Spratt, 80, infielder for Boston (National League) in 1911 and 1912.
July 4 – Lew Drill, 92, catcher/outfielder for Washington, Baltimore and Detroit of the American League (1902–1905), appearing in 293 games. 
July 5 – Ed Hemingway, 76, reserve second- and third baseman for the 1914 St. Louis Browns, 1917 New York Giants and 1918 Philadelphia Phillies.
July 8 – Bill Carrigan, 85, manager and backup catcher for the Boston Red Sox' world champions in 1915 and 1916.
July 8 – Red Rolfe, 60, third baseman for New York Yankees (1931 and 1934–1942), and member of five World Series champions; three-time AL All-Star; manager of Detroit Tigers from 1949 to July 4, 1952; Ivy League baseball coach (Yale) and athletics director (Dartmouth).
July 19 – Otto Vogel, 69, outfielder who appeared in 111 games for 1923–1924 Chicago Cubs.
July 19 – Al Williams, 55, pitcher who appeared in 46 total games for 1937–1938 Philadelphia Athletics.
July 23 – Roy Mahaffey, 65, pitcher in 224 games—197 for the Athletics—for three MLB clubs over nine seasons between 1926 and 1936; member of Philadelphia's 1930 World Series champions.
July 27 – Glenn Elliott, 49, southpaw reliever who pitched in 34 games for the 1947–1949 Boston Braves; scout for the Philadelphia Phillies from 1960 until his death.
July 29 – Douglas Sydnor, 49, World War II-era outfielder who appeared in 13 Negro National League games in 1943 and 1944.
July 30 – Flint Rhem, 68, pitcher who won 20 games (losing 7) for the 1926 world champion St. Louis Cardinals and went 105–97 over 12 National League seasons (1924–1928 and 1930–1936) with Cardinals, Boston Braves and Philadelphia Phillies.

August
August 5 – Ralph Caldwell, 85, southpaw who pitched in 13 career games for the 1904–1905 Philadelphia Phillies.
August 5 – Verdo Elmore, 69, outfielder who played in seven games for the 1924 St. Louis Browns.
August 9 – Glenn Myatt, 72, lefty-swinging catcher who appeared in 1,004 games between 1920 and 1936 for four MLB clubs, principally the Cleveland Indians.
August 11 – William Marriott, 75, third baseman who played in 265 total games for the Chicago Cubs (1917, 1920–1921), Boston Braves (1925) and Brooklyn Robins (1926–1927).
August 15 – Howie Williamson, 64, minor-league outfielder who made ten pinch hitting appearances for 1928 St. Louis Cardinals.
August 17 – Frank Shellenback, 70, spitball pitcher who played for 1918–1919 Chicago White Sox and won 295 games in the Pacific Coast League; later a longtime pitching coach.
August 19 – Álejandro Carrasquel, 57, Venezuelan pitcher who posted a 50–39 (3.73) record in 258 games for the Washington Senators (1939–1945) and Chicago White Sox (1949).
August 30 – Stew Bolen, 66, left-hander who went 3–13 (6.09 ERA) in 41 career games with the 1926–1927 St. Louis Browns and 1931–1932 Philadelphia Phillies.
August 30 – Tim McKeithan, 62, pitcher who worked in a total of ten games over parts of three seasons (1932–1934) with Philadelphia Athletics.

September
September 10 – Billy "Jap" Barbeau, 87, third baseman who played 199 MLB games for the 1905–1906 Cleveland Naps, 1909 Pittsburgh Pirates and 1909–1910 St. Louis Cardinals.
September 11 – Dick Carter, 53, third-base coach of the Philadelphia Phillies from 1959 to May 30, 1960; previously, scouted for Phils and played and managed in their farm system.
September 14 – Jackie Tavener, 71, shortstop who played all or parts of six seasons between 1921 and 1929 for the Detroit Tigers and Cleveland Indians.
September 18 – Joe Grace, 55, outfielder who appeared in 484 games over six seasons between 1938 and 1947 with the St. Louis Browns and Washington Senators. 
September 28 – Norm McMillan, 73, infielder for four MLB clubs in six seasons spanning 1922 to 1929; most notably, the regular third baseman for pennant-winning 1929 Chicago Cubs; started all five games of 1929 World Series, going two for 20 with two walks.
September 29 – Tommy Leach, 91, third baseman and center fielder, primarily for the Pittsburgh Pirates, who led the NL in runs twice and home runs once.
September 30 – Jim Galvin, 62, minor league catcher who played briefly for the 1930 Boston Red Sox, seeing action in two pinch-hitting assignments.
September 30 – Hank Thompson, 43, third baseman who was the third black player in MLB history as a member of the 1947 St. Louis Browns; in 1949, he and Monte Irvin broke the New York Giants' color line; member of Giants' 1954 World Series champions.

October
October 2 – Gordon Cobbledick, 70, sportswriter for the Cleveland Plain Dealer from 1928 to 1964.
October 2 – Danny O'Connell, 42, infielder who played for the Pittsburgh Pirates, Milwaukee Braves, New York/San Francisco Giants and Washington Senators across ten MLB seasons from 1950–1962.
October 6 – Roy Crumpler, 73, left-handed pitcher who appeared in five career games for the 1920 Detroit Tigers and 1925 Philadelphia Phillies.
October 9 – Don Hoak, 41, fiery third baseman on 1955 Brooklyn Dodgers and 1960 Pittsburgh Pirates World Series championship teams; played 11 seasons in National League for five clubs; selected to 1957 NL All-Star team.
October 9 – Ray Lucas, 61, pitcher who worked in 22 total games for the 1929–1931 New York Giants and 1933–1934 Brooklyn Dodgers.
October 16 – Larry Boerner, 64, pitcher who posted an 0–4 (5.02) record in 21 games for the 1932 Boston Red Sox.
October 23 – Monk Dubiel, 51, pitcher who appeared in 187 career games for 1944–1945 New York Yankees, 1948 Philadelphia Phillies and 1949–1952 Chicago Cubs.
October 24 – Jack Bentley, 74, left-handed pitcher and first baseman who posted a 46–33 (4.01) record on the mound and a .291 batting average in 584 at bats at the plate for the Washington Senators (1913–1916), New York Giants (1923–1926 and 1927), and Philadelphia Phillies (1926); had a brilliant minor-league career as a member of the Baltimore Orioles from 1919–1922.
October 26 – Jim Blackburn, 45, World War II combat veteran and Prisoner of War who pitched for postwar Cincinnati Reds, making 18 career appearances during the 1948 and 1951 seasons.
October 27 – Charlie Jamieson, 76, standout outfielder for Cleveland Indians (1919–1932) and two other AL cubs; batted .303 lifetime in 1,779 games, eclipsing .300 mark ten times and leading Junior Circuit in hits (222) in 1923; member of Cleveland's 1920 World Series champions.
October 28 – Dave Callahan, 81, outfielder who played 19 MLB games for the 1910–1911 Cleveland Naps; stole 445 bases during his 17-year career in minor leagues.
October 28 – Joe Rullo, 53, second baseman who appeared in 51 total MLB games for wartime 1943–1944 Philadelphia Athletics.

November
November 1 – George Winn, 72, pitcher for the Boston Red Sox (1919) and Cleveland Indians (1922–23).
November 7 – Chick Galloway, 73, shortstop who played 1,076 games for the 1919–1927 Philadelphia Athletics and 1928 Detroit Tigers.
November 12 – Eddie Hurley, 61, American League umpire from 1947 to 1965; officiated in 2,826 regular-season contests, four World Series and three All-Star games; was behind the plate in St. Louis on August 19, 1951, when Eddie Gaedel came to bat in Bill Veeck's famous stunt; led AL umpires in ejections three times over a 19-year career.
November 11 – Stump Edington, 78,  outfielder who batted .302 in 53 at bats for the 1912 Pittsburgh Pirates in his lone MLB opportunity.
November 14 – Curt Roberts, 40, first black player in Pittsburgh Pirates history (debuting April 13, 1954); second baseman who played in 171 games over three seasons (1954–1956) with Bucs.
November 15 – Billy Southworth, 76, Hall of Fame manager who won 1,044 regular-season games as skipper of the St. Louis Cardinals (1929 and 1940–1945) and Boston Braves (1946–1951); captured World Series titles in 1942 and 1944 and National League pennants with St. Louis (1943) and Boston (1948); his .597 career winning percentage is second, all-time, to Joe McCarthy; in his playing days, an outfielder who appeared in 1,192 games in 13 seasons for five teams between 1913 and 1929, and batted .297.
November 16 – Vin Campbell, 81, outfielder who played 546 games during a career spent with the Chicago Cubs, Pittsburgh Pirates, and two Federal League clubs (Indianapolis and Newark) over six seasons between 1908 and 1915.
November 20 – Paddy Baumann, 83, second baseman and third baseman who got into 299 games for the Detroit Tigers and New York Yankees between 1911 and 1917.
November 20 – Elmer Wilson, 74, second baseman for St. Louis (1925) and Dayton (1926) of the Negro National League.
November 24 – Phil Gallivan, 62, pitcher who appeared in 54 career games for the Brooklyn Robins (1931) and Chicago White Sox (1932, 1934).
November 24 – Pablo Morales, 64, Venezuelan professional baseball executive for more than three decades, and former owner of the Leones del Caracas club.
November 26 – Emil Kush, 53, pitcher who won 21 of 33 decisions for the Chicago Cubs (1941–1942 and 1946–1949).
November 29 – Bun Hayes, 66, pitcher for five Negro leagues clubs, primarily the Baltimore Black Sox, from 1928–1930 and 1932–1935,
November 30 – Eddie Eayrs, 79, outfielder/pitcher who played for the Pittsburgh Pirates, Boston Braves and Brooklyn Robins in the early 20th century.
November – Billy Horne, 53, nicknamed "Little Grumbler", All-Star second baseman and shortstop who played for three Negro leagues clubs between 1938 and 1946.

December
December 3 – Roy Wilson, 83, pitcher for the Chicago White Sox in the 1920s.
December 7 – Lefty O'Doul, 72, left fielder who batted .349 with 1,140 hits in his 970-game career and won two batting titles after being converted from a pitcher; winningest manager in Pacific Coast League history, and earned additional fame as the "father" of professional baseball in Japan.
December 10 – Jack Tobin, 77, diminutive —  — but hard-hitting right fielder who batted .309 and amassed 1,906 hits over a 13-year career (1914–1916 and 1918–1927) spent mostly with St. Louis Browns; led American League in triples (18) in 1921; later a Browns' coach.
December 11 – Ollie Fuhrman, 83, catcher who hit .333 for the Philadelphia Athletics in 1922.
December 30 – Herman Howard, 59, left-handed pitcher in the Negro leagues from 1937–1940 and in 1946.

References